The  Ministry of Commerce (MOC) is the Burmese government agency plays a vital role in the transformation process of the implementation of a market-oriented economic system. Its headquarters is located at Building 3 and 52, Nay Pyi Taw, in Myanmar.

Departmental bodies
 Office of the Minister
 Department of Trade
 Department of Consumer Affairs
 Department of Trade Promotion Organization

History
From the time of independence in 1948 up to 1962, foreign trade was conducted by the following boards and corporations:
 Union of Burma Purchase Board
 Civil Supplies Administration Board
 Electrical Supplies Board
 State Agricultural Marketing Board
 State Timber Board
 Cooperatives
 Joint venture corporations
 Defence Service Institute
 Burma Economic Development Corporation
 Private traders

Establishment of Trade Council
In 1964, wholesale shops, broker houses, companies, department stores and warehouses all over the country were nationalised. In 1965, the Trade Council was established and the following trade organisations were set up under the Ministry of Trade:
 Central trade
 22 trade corporations
 14 state/divisional trade offices
 283 township trade offices
 1942 people's shops

In 1976, in accordance with the economic policy of the Burma Socialist Programme Party the trade organisations were reformed as follows:
 Department of Trade
 11 trading corporations and their divisional/branch offices, factories/workshops
 14 state/divisional trade offices

New establishments after 1988
To be in line with the changing economic system, in 1989 the Department of Trade was changed to the Directorate of Trade with extended functions and responsibilities.
In 1989–90 the following domestic and foreign joint ventures were set up and operated:

Domestic joint ventures
 Joint Venture Corporation No. 1 Ltd.
 Joint Venture Corporation No. 2 Ltd.
 Joint Venture Corporation No. 3 Ltd.
 Joint Venture Corporation No. 4 Ltd.
 Joint Venture Corporation No. 5 Ltd.
 Joint Venture Corporation No. 6 Ltd.
 Joint Venture Corporation No. 7 Ltd.
 Joint Venture Corporation No. 8 Ltd.
 Joint Venture Corporation No. 9 Ltd.
 Northern Shan State JV Co., Ltd.
 Myanmar Citizens' Bank Ltd.

Foreign joint ventures 
 Myanmar Rice Engineering Co., Ltd.
 Myanmar Malaysia International Ltd.
 Myanmar Motor Ltd.
 Myanmar Singapore International Ltd.
 Myanmar Borneo Ltd.
 Myanmar Inotech Ltd.
 Myanmar Chan Ltd.
 Myanmar Tokyo Maruichi International Ltd.
 Myanmar Natsteel Hardware Ltd.
 Myanmar Inspection and Testing Services

In 1992, the Hotel and Tourism Corporation was upgraded to ministry-level and the relevant organisations, the Foodstuff and Beverages Enterprise and Hotel and Tourism Services were transferred to the Ministry of Hotel and Tourism. In 1993 the Company Registration Office, Companies Control Department and the international Organisation Sections (GATT/WTO) under the Directorate of Trade were transferred to the newly-established ministry, the Ministry of National Planning and Economic Development. In 1996 the Ministry of Trade was changed to the Ministry of Commerce with a view to implement economic activities for the development of the national economy. In 1996 the Ministry of Commerce established the Department of Border Trade and it currently has 10 branch offices at the borders of neighbouring countries. In 1997 the International Organisation Section, including WTO, was retransferred from the Ministry of National Planning and Economic Development to the Ministry of Commerce.

Re-organisational activities under the Ministry of Commerce 
Since 1998, six trading organisations and two service enterprises under the Ministry of Commerce have been abolished. Domestic and foreign joint ventures were also abolished except Myanmar Citizens' Bank Ltd. and Myanmar Inspection and Testing Services Ltd.

The Ministry of Commerce created a motto of Advance Forward Through Commerce and it has been conducting various activities for the development of the national economy. The Ministry of Commerce has also restructured the following departments to be in line with the adopted market-oriented economy since 1 April 1998:
 Office of the Minister
 Directorate of Trade
 Department of Border Trade
 Myanma Agricultural Produce Trading

Department of Trade
There were the following departments:
 International Trade Promotion Department
 Planning & Statistics Department
 Export Department
 Import Department
 Export Import Policy and Registration Department
 Accounts Department
 Administration & Training Department

Department of Consumer Affairs
Department of Consumer Affairs was established on 1 April 2016. There were the following divisions:
 Division of Administration
 Division of Accounts
 Division of Policy Review, Planning & Statistics
 Division of IT and Quality Management
 Division of Product Safety
 Division of Consumer Affairs
 State and Regional Branch offices
 District Level Offices

Vision
 To further strengthen the existing friendship between the two countries
 To promote border trade between the two countries putting it in line with normal trade
 To get the reasonable revenue for the state
 To facilitate private business activities thereby allowing them to acquire reasonable profits
 To enhance the smooth flow of commodities

Mission 
 To increase the volume of trade year after year
 To get the targeted revenue fully
 To be free from corruption

Official border trade points

Unofficial border trade points

Myanmar Agricultural Produce Trading
Myanma Agricultural Produce Trading (MAPT) is a government organisation under the Ministry of Commerce.

MAPT has laid down the following six main objectives:
 To generate more foreign exchange income for the development of the national economy
 To explore new cultivable land and organise extensive cultivation
 To assist the enhancement of better quality crop production and strive for export promotion
 To promote new exportable products
 To develop the rice milling industries
 To successfully implement the state policies with regard to agricultural produce

Organisation
The managing director is the head of MAPT.
Under Myanmar Agricultural Produce Trading (MAPT), there were the following departments:
 Paddy and Rice Department
 Pulse Beans & Other Crops Department
 Milling, Engineering, Bran Oil Mail & Project Department
 Export Department
 Movement Department
 Planning & Finance Department
 Administration Department
 Inspection Department
 State/Divisional Offices, District Offices and Township Offices
Within the organisational set-up of MAPT, there are 4 functional departments as follows:

Warehousing, Handling and Export Department, Grain Department, Milling, Engineering & Bran Oil Mills Department, and the Administration Department. The Post-harvest Technology Application Centre (PTAC) under MAPT undertakes post-harvest activities, research, development and extension (RDX) works especially including food grains, fruits and vegetables and issuance of certificates relating to the quality of crops and analytical results of chemical compositions, pesticide residue, aflatoxins etc.

MAPT renders its assistance to private sectors in the following activities:

 Extends its fullest co-operations relating to exports of grains and imports of commodity from abroad
 Assists to obtain the quick result relating to various laboratory test
 Provides necessary assistance for rice milling industry and oil processing industry

MAPT Operations 
MAPT assists the in following steps relating to export business that are allowed by the state to the private sector, especially grains exports, the export of new commodities, and import business:

 Undertakes the various steps of the exporting business, commencing from searching the markets for export commodities to the final negotiation stage of the shipping documents
 Renders its services to make each processing step relating to import flow smoothly
 Undertakes all necessary steps relating to the shipment of export commodities
 Carries out rental services for warehouses if necessary
 Undertakes pest control services for grain storage
 Assists necessary work to producers to become successful exporters

MAPT undertakes the following activities relating to the inspection services of exported goods and imported goods:

 Conducts preshipment inspection of commodities for export and inspection of imported commodities relating to quality/specifications, quantity, weight, measurement, packing and marking, etc.
 Issues certificates of laboratory analysis and testing
 Conducts inspection and surveying services for exporters and importers with reasonable service charges for mutual benefits
 Undertakes laboratory analysis and testing of soil and water, quality of food grains and extends technical assistance on post-harvest technology

MAPT conducts services relating to analysis and testing of soil and water:

 Undertakes analysis relating to the physical quality of food grain; milling quality; fibre content; contents of dust, husk, sand and other admixture; contents of discoloured grains, etc.
 Undertakes analysis and testing of the qualities of food grain such as moisture content; composition of ash, protein, starch/carbohydrate; fibre and other chemical composition, etc.
 Undertakes analysis and testing for aflatoxin contamination
 Undertakes analysis and testing of quality of oil and oil crops, colour condition, specific gravity, oil colour test, cloud point, moisture content, fat, acidity, etc.
 Extends technical assistance on pest control services

MAPT undertakes the following services relating to the milling of rice, and construction and maintenance of rice mills:

 Follows rice milling activities for effective improvement in quality with reasonable affordable charges.
 Milling paddy to white rice
 Milling brown rice to white rice
 Remilling of rice
 Recleaning of rice and broken rice
 Milling paddy to brown rice
 Assists private entrepreneurs who wish to construct new rice mills, improving development of existing rice mills and maintenance of existing rice mills
 Manufactures and sells mobile and low-cost small rice mills
 Assists private sector with rice milling technology

MAPT undertakes the following services relating to edible rice bran oil mills:

 Conducts nrocorry of edible rice bran oil with reasonable charges.
 Removes the colour and odour from various types of edible oil and ensures purity of oil.
 Extracts oil from soyabeans, purifies raw palm oil and extracts oil from expelled cakes (groundnut cake, sesame cake) by using the chemical solvent extraction method.

MAPT undertakes the following machinery installation services to upgrade the quality of food grains:

 Cleans paddy machines and beans
 Dries paddy machines and other grains

MAPT also renders the following engineering services:

 Converts cars with diesel and petrol engines as well as LPG cars to the CNG system
 Conducts design services for modern and concentrated warehouse designs
 Conducts consultancy services relating to the drawing of building designs and estimating construction costs for rice mills and bran oil mills

Ministers of Commerce 
 U Kyaw Myint (1948–1949)
 U Kyaw Myint (1950–1952)
 U Rashid (1954-1956, 1960-1962)
 Brigade General Aung Gyi (1962–1963)
 Colonel Chit Myaing (1963–1964)
 Brigade General Tin Pe (1964–1971)
 Colonel Maung Lwin (1971–1974)
 U San Win (1974–1976)
 U Hla Aye (1976–1978)
 U Ye Daung (1978–1978)
 U Khin Maung Gyi (1978–1988)
 Colonel David Abel (1988–1992)
 General Tun Kyi (1992–1997)
 General Kyaw Than (1997–1999)
 Brigade General Pyaih Sone (1999–2004)
 Brigade General Tin Naing Thein (2004–2011)
 Win Myint (2011–2016)
 Than Myint (2016–2021)
 Pwint San (2021– 19 August 2022)
 Aung Naing Oo (19 August 2022 - Incumbent)

References

External links 
 

Commerce
Myanmar
Economy of Myanmar
1948 establishments in Burma
Ministries established in 1948